The Farglory Financial Center is a skyscraper located in Xinyi District, Taipei, Taiwan. It is the eighth tallest building in Taiwan and the fourth tallest in Xinyi Special District(after Taipei 101, Taipei Nan Shan Plaza and Cathay Landmark). The height of building is 208 m, the floor area is 61,147.58m2, and it comprises 32 floors above ground, as well as 4 basement levels.

See also 
 List of tallest buildings in Taiwan
 Xinyi Special District
 Farglory International Center

References

Office buildings completed in 2013
Skyscraper office buildings in Taipei
Xinyi Special District